Vulcan: The Tunisian Campaign is a 1986 video game published by Cases Computer Simulations. It is the third in a series of computer wargames written for the ZX Spectrum by Robert T. Smith, following the similarly styled Arnhem and Desert Rats.

Gameplay
Vulcan: The Tunisian Campaign is a game in which players have the option of playing four scenarios on a tactical level, or the entire 1943 campaign in Tunisia on a strategic level.

Reception
H. E. Dille reviewed the game for Computer Gaming World, and stated that "Vulcan is a fine game for novice and intermediate level wargarners, or anyone with a particular passion for this period. The improvements made to the operating system are logical and appreciated, although long term re-playability is still an issue. Bottom line: Nothing truly innovative, but recommended nonetheless."

Phillipa Irving concluded in Crash issue 39, "This is Spectrum wargaming at its very best; complex in operation, wide in scope, and easy to use".

Reviews
Sinclair User - May, 1987
ACE (Advanced Computer Entertainment) - Dec, 1987
Computer and Video Games - Aug, 1987
Computer Gamer - Jun, 1987
Amiga Format - Nov, 1989
Your Sinclair - Apr, 1987
Computer Gaming World - Dec, 1991
ASM (Aktueller Software Markt) - Nov, 1989

References

1986 video games
Amiga games
Amstrad CPC games
Atari ST games
Computer wargames
DOS games
Turn-based strategy video games
Video games about Nazi Germany
Video games developed in the United Kingdom
Video games set in Tunisia
World War II video games
ZX Spectrum games